The 2019–20 season was Cheltenham Town's 133rd season in existence and their fourth consecutive season in League Two. Along with competing in League Two, the club also participated in the FA Cup, EFL Cup and EFL Trophy.

The season covered the period from 1 July 2019 to 30 June 2020.

Pre-season
The Robins announced pre-season friendlies against Stratford Town, Hereford, Taunton Town, Leicester City, Shrewsbury Town, and Bromsgrove Sporting.

Competitions

League Two

League table

Results summary

Results by matchday

Matches
On Thursday, 20 June 2019, the EFL League Two fixtures were revealed.

Play-offs

FA Cup

The first round draw was made on 21 October 2019. The second round draw was made live on 11 November from Chichester City's stadium, Oaklands Park.

EFL Cup

The first round draw was made on 20 June.

EFL Trophy

On 9 July 2019, the pre-determined group stage draw was announced with Invited clubs to be drawn on 12 July 2019.

Transfers

Transfers in

Loans in

Loans out

Transfers out

References

Cheltenham Town
Cheltenham Town F.C. seasons